James Henry Jones (September 13, 1830 – March 22, 1904) was a U.S. Representative from Texas.

Born in Shelby County, Alabama, Jones moved with his parents to Talladega County, Alabama, in early youth. He pursued an academic course and studied law. He was admitted to the bar in 1851 and commenced practice in Henderson, Texas.

During the Civil War  Jones enlisted in the Confederate States Army and served as captain and lieutenant colonel of the Eleventh Texas Infantry, and later as colonel commanding the Third Brigade of Walker's Texas Division.

Jones was elected as a Democrat to the Forty-eighth and Forty-ninth Congresses (March 4, 1883 – March 3, 1887).

He resumed the practice of law in Henderson, Texas, and died there March 22, 1904. Jones was interred in the New Cemetery, Henderson, Texas.

References

External links

1830 births
1904 deaths
People from Shelby County, Alabama
Confederate States Army officers
Democratic Party members of the United States House of Representatives from Texas
19th-century American politicians